Bangla (Bengali: বাংলা) may refer to:

Bengali language, an eastern Indo-Aryan language
The endonym of Bengal, a geographical and ethno-linguistic region in South Asia
Bangla-, a prefix indicating Bangladesh

Businesses and organisations 
 Bangla Academy, an academy in Bangladesh
 Bangla College, a college in Dhaka, Bangladesh

Television 
ATN Bangla
Bangla TV
BBC Bangla
Colors Bangla
DD Bangla
Jago Bangla
Sun Bangla
Zee Bangla

Others 
 Bangla (band), a folk-rock band from Bangladesh
 Bangla (drink), an alcoholic drink from West Bengal
 Bangla (film), a 2019 Italian film
 Bangla, Nepal
 Dak Bangla or bangla, originally referring to a bungalow, used to mean "a house in the Bengali style"
 .bangla, the secondary Internet country code top-level domain for Bangladesh

See also
 
 Bangala (disambiguation)
 Bengal (disambiguation)